Antennarius moai, commonly known as the Moai frogfish, is a species of fish native to Easter Island in the South Pacific. This species was discovered by Gerald R. Allen et al. in the 1970s. FishBase lists this taxon as a synonym of Antennatus coccineus.

References

Antennariidae
Fish described in 1970